Chickamauga Lake is a reservoir in the United States along the Tennessee River created when the Chickamauga Dam, as part of the Tennessee Valley Authority, was completed in 1940.  The lake stretches from Watts Bar Dam at mile 529.9 (853 km) to Chickamauga Dam at mile 471.0 (758 km) making the lake 58.9 miles (94.8 km) long. It borders Rhea County, Meigs County, and Hamilton County with 810 miles (1,303 km) of shoreline and two bridges crossing it at State Highway 60 and Highway 30.  The lake is commonly used for recreational and outdoor activities, especially at the southern end, due to the high population density surrounding it.  It was named after the Chickamauga Cherokee who used to live in the area.

The Hiwassee River empties into Chickamauga Lake at Hiwassee Island, just north of the Highway 60 bridge at mile 500 (804.5 km).

Chickamauga Lake is immediately downstream from Watts Bar Lake and immediately upstream from Nickajack Lake.

Actual lake levels vary due to weather conditions and power needs.

The lake is a popular venue for fishing and a variety of gamefish can be caught there including largemouth bass, smallmouth bass and catfish. As a result, the venue hosts popular fishing tournaments.

See also
 Dams and reservoirs of the Tennessee River
 Harrison Bay State Park, a park along the shore of Chickamauga Lake
 Booker T. Washington State Park (Tennessee), another park along the shore of Chickamauga Lake

References

Protected areas of Bradley County, Tennessee
Protected areas of Hamilton County, Tennessee
Protected areas of McMinn County, Tennessee
Protected areas of Meigs County, Tennessee
Reservoirs in Tennessee
Protected areas of Rhea County, Tennessee
Tennessee River
Tennessee Valley Authority
Geography of Chattanooga, Tennessee
Tourist attractions in Chattanooga, Tennessee
Bodies of water of Bradley County, Tennessee
Bodies of water of Hamilton County, Tennessee
Bodies of water of McMinn County, Tennessee
Bodies of water of Meigs County, Tennessee